Battifollo is a comune (municipality) in the Province of Cuneo in the Italian region Piedmont, located about  southeast of Turin and about  east of Cuneo.

Battifollo borders the following municipalities: Bagnasco, Ceva, Lisio, Nucetto, and Scagnello. Sights include remains of a castle, used by the French troops in 1796 as defensive position.

References 

Cities and towns in Piedmont
Comunità Montana Valli Mongia, Cevetta e Langa Cebana